Erling Enrique Moreno Álvarez (born January 13, 1997) is a Colombian professional baseball pitcher who is a free agent.

Moreno signed with the Chicago Cubs as an international free agent in July 2013. After signing, Moreno was assigned to the VSL Cubs, and after throwing three scoreless innings in his debut for them, he was reassigned to the DSL Cubs where he finished the season, going 0-1 with a 1.08 ERA in 8.1 innings pitched. Moreno spent 2015 with the AZL Cubs where he posted a 1.93 ERA in 4.2 innings pitched. In 2016, he split time between the AZL and the Eugene Emeralds. In 62.1 innings pitched between both teams, Moreno pitched to a 4-3 record, 1.88 ERA, and a .90 WHIP. He spent 2017 with the South Bend Cubs where he posted a 2-4 record with a 4.22 ERA in a career high 64 innings pitched. On November 2, 2020, Moreno elected free agency.

Moreno was on Colombia's roster for the 2017 World Baseball Classic.

References

External links

1997 births
Living people
Arizona League Cubs players
Baseball pitchers
Colombian baseball players
Colombian expatriate baseball players in the United States
Dominican Summer League Cubs players
Colombian expatriate baseball players in the Dominican Republic
Eugene Emeralds players
Minor league baseball players
Sportspeople from Cartagena, Colombia
South Bend Cubs players
Venezuelan Summer League Cubs players
2017 World Baseball Classic players
Colombian expatriate baseball players in Venezuela